Paul Woolley may refer to:

Paul Woolley (economist) (born 1939), British economist
Paul Woolley (historian) (1902–1984), American professor of Church history
Paul Woolley (physician), American physician specializing in internal medicine and Clinical Professor of Medicine